Karl Kistner (born 19 June 1929) is a German boxer. He competed in the men's light heavyweight event at the 1952 Summer Olympics.

References

1929 births
Living people
German male boxers
Olympic boxers of Germany
Boxers at the 1952 Summer Olympics
Place of birth missing (living people)
Light-heavyweight boxers